Cremorne Gardens was a pleasure garden (now referred to as amusement parks) established in 1853 on the banks of the Yarra River at Richmond in Melbourne, Australia. The gardens were established by James Ellis who had earlier managed and leased similar gardens of the same name on the banks of the River Thames at Chelsea in London.  He had been declared bankrupt and emigrated to Australia to take advantage of the business opportunities made possible by the Victorian gold rush and its accompanying population explosion. His first venture in the entertainment world in Melbourne was Astley's Amphitheatre, but his experiences in catering in London inclined him to a profit making business with a wider basis. Because of previous experience he had established contacts in the theatrical world of London. He took advantage of them to create a venue with viable entertainments to divert the population of the rapidly expanding capital of the new Australian state where entertainment was demanded by a predominantly male society.  

The wowser element in Melbourne did not approve of the pleasure gardens. Ellis had invested much money in them and they were very popular, but criticism of the availability of liquor and the use of the venue by prostitutes went against him. Ellis had tried to gain social favour by donating percentages of profits to charity but that did not help him. The disapproval was an attitude which had frequently been taken against the large pleasure gardens in London on which Ellis had based his colonial duplicate.  It would not, however, have been beneath Ellis to take advantage of the needs of diggers holidaying in Melbourne and on the hunt for a bit of fun.  His detractors forced his sale of Cremorne Gardens but they survived in the hands of someone who had the skill and experience to administer and develop them.  Ellis went on to own a hotel in Fitzroy.

The gardens were acquired by the popular theatrical entrepreneur and local identity George Coppin who expanded them significantly using even better contacts in the world of English theatre than Ellis enjoyed.  Cremorne was Coppin's indulgence and hobby and he poured money into them without applying business acumen.  For a time he lived on site. The residence had been built by the Colonial Architect, Henry Ginn, who had originally established the gardens as part of his up-river retreat in the mid-1840s.  Entertainment provided included a Cyclorama, bowling alley, menagerie, dancers and nightly fireworks. In 1856 he opened his Royal Pantheon Theatre, initially managed by R. Younge (brother of Fred), followed by J. P. Greville. Coppin continued the presentation of the annual panoramas introduced by Ellis. Patrons arrived by riverboat or by train at the purpose-built railway station. The gardens were notable as being the location of the first balloon flight in Australia when in 1858 Englishman William Dean floated seven miles (11 km) north to Brunswick. In 1859 Coppin imported six camels from Aden as exhibits for the Cremorne Gardens menagerie and in 1860 he sold them to the Exploration Committee of the Royal Society of Victoria who used them on the Burke and Wills expedition.

With the rise of Puritanism in the 1860s, the Gardens became hugely unprofitable and could no longer be maintained; Coppin closed the doors in February 1863. The land was sold and became an asylum which itself closed in the 1880s. The land was then subdivided for housing by Thomas Bent. With the turn of the century much of the housing gave way to small and large industrial establishments but much of the small working class housing remains today and has been progressively gentrified. A small park is at the southern end of the area previously occupied by the gardens and a plaque marks their location and the place from which the hot air balloons were launched. The site of the gardens no longer fronts the river because of the construction of the South Eastern Freeway in 1961. The area of Richmond in which the gardens were located was formally renamed Cremorne in 1999 and is used by locals as much out of historical respect as to avoid the old working class implications of the name Richmond. A view of Cremorne from South Yarra can be found in the works of S. T. Gill
and the site is described in Louisa Ann Meredith's description of her stay in Melbourne with her husband and son in Over the straits: a visit to Victoria.
The site now holds an artwork by Ugo Rondinone called 'Our Magic Hour'

References

External links
Map of Cremorne Gardens
Allom Lovell & Associates, 1998, City of Yarra Heritage Review: Volume 3?, Thematic History, Accessed 21 August, 2015   Page101 – 102 "Cremorne Gardens, Richmond" in Excerpt of Pages 99 to 109.

Parks in Melbourne
Defunct amusement parks in Australia
1853 establishments in Australia
City of Yarra